Lee Yong-jae (born 8 June 1991) is a South Korean footballer. He plays for K League 1 club Incheon United.

Club career 
Lee began his career with Pohang Jecheol Technical High School and, after the 2007 FIFA U-17 World Cup, left for Europe signing with Watford through KFA Youth Project. On 6 September 2009 the French club FC Nantes signed the South Korean forward from Watford FC U-18 to a four-year deal. Prior to joining the French side, Lee went on trial with Willem II Tilburg.
Lee scored his first goal for FC Nantes against Châteauroux on 22 October 2010.

International career 
Lee represented his homeland at 2007 FIFA U-17 World Cup in his native South Korea and played one game.
He also played for the South Korea national under-20 football team.

Career statistics

Club

International goals
Scores and results list South Korea's goal tally first, score column indicates score after each Lee goal.

Honours

International
South Korea U23
 Asian Games: 2014
South Korea
 EAFF East Asian Cup: 2015

References

External links 
 
 Profile at Kyoto Sanga FC
 
 

Lee Yong-jae at Asian Games Incheon 2014

1991 births
Living people
Footballers from Seoul
Association football forwards
South Korean footballers
South Korean expatriate footballers
Watford F.C. players
FC Nantes players
Red Star F.C. players
V-Varen Nagasaki players
Kyoto Sanga FC players
Fagiano Okayama players
Ligue 2 players
J2 League players
Expatriate footballers in France
Expatriate footballers in England
Expatriate footballers in Japan
South Korean expatriate sportspeople in England
South Korean expatriate sportspeople in France
South Korean expatriate sportspeople in Japan
Footballers at the 2014 Asian Games
Asian Games medalists in football
Asian Games gold medalists for South Korea
Medalists at the 2014 Asian Games